The women's team sprint competition at the 2018 Asian Games was held on 27 August at the Jakarta International Velodrome.

Schedule
All times are Western Indonesia Time (UTC+07:00)

Results

Qualifying

Finals

Bronze

Gold

References

Track Women Team sprint